Ilya Alekseyevich Burov (born 13 November 1991), also spelled Ilia Burov, is a Russian freestyle skier, specializing in aerials.

Career
Burov competed at the 2014 Winter Olympics for Russia. He placed 10th in the first qualifying round in the aerials, failing to advance. He subsequently placed 10th in the second qualification round, again failing to advance. Burov completed at the 2018 Winter Olympics representing Olympic Athletes from Russia. He placed 8th in the first qualifying round in the aerials, failing to advance. He subsequently placed 1st in the second qualification round and advanced to finals. The next day he placed 6th in both final round 1 and Round 2 and placed 3rd in the final round 3, winning the bronze medal. 

As of February 2018, his best showing at the World Championships is 5th, in the 2015 aerials.

Burov made his World Cup debut in January 2011. As of February 2018, his best World Cup finish is 2nd, at a World Cup stages held in Moscow in 2015 and 2018. His best World Cup overall finish in aerials is 4th in 2014–15.

He competed in the 2022 Beijing Winter Olympics and won his second bronze in Aerials with a score of 114.93.

Personal life
Ilya's younger brother, Maxim Burov (born 1998), is also a Russian freestyle skier and Olympian. Maxim Burov is a three-time World Champion and three-time World Cup holder.

World Cup podiums

Individual podiums
 0 wins
 8 podiums

Team podiums
 0 wins
 3 podiums

References

1991 births
Living people
Olympic freestyle skiers of Russia
Freestyle skiers at the 2014 Winter Olympics
Freestyle skiers at the 2018 Winter Olympics
Freestyle skiers at the 2022 Winter Olympics
Sportspeople from Yaroslavl
Russian male freestyle skiers
Medalists at the 2018 Winter Olympics
Medalists at the 2022 Winter Olympics
Olympic bronze medalists for the Russian Olympic Committee athletes
Olympic bronze medalists for Olympic Athletes from Russia
Olympic medalists in freestyle skiing